Frank Wiafe Danquah (born 14 October 1989) is a Dutch footballer of Ghanaian descent who plays as a forward for Hoofdklasse club DUNO.

Club career
Frank Wiafe Danquah began in the youth teams of Ajax Amsterdam in the Netherlands. He was given then a trial by Newcastle United and signed with them a youth contract in July 2006. He impressed in the reserves and became the reserves' topscorer and on 8 July 2008 he signed a 2-year professional contract with Newcastle United.

When Wiafe Danquah’s contract expired in the summer of 2010 he was not given a new contract and instead joined Ferencváros in Hungary. His contract with the club was disbanded though due to financial problems in late 2010. On 17 February 2011 he joined Waasland-Beveren in Belgium. In February 2013 he moved to Romania, when he signed a 6-month contract with Brașov.

In September 2014, Wiafe Danquah signed for Achilles '29 until the end of the 2014–15 season. He joined FC Lienden for the 2015/16 Topklasse season and moved to Eerste Divisie side Fortuna Sittard the next season, only to return to Lienden in January 2017.

On 5 February 2021, Wiafe Danquah signed with DUNO in the Hoofdklasse.

References

External links
 

1989 births
Living people
Dutch sportspeople of Ghanaian descent
Footballers from Amsterdam
Association football forwards
Dutch footballers
Newcastle United F.C. players
Ferencvárosi TC footballers
S.K. Beveren players
Newcastle Benfield F.C. players
FC Brașov (1936) players
ASA 2013 Târgu Mureș players
Achilles '29 players
FC Lienden players
Fortuna Sittard players
Nemzeti Bajnokság I players
Northern Football League players
Liga I players
Eerste Divisie players
Tweede Divisie players
Derde Divisie players
Vierde Divisie players
Dutch expatriate footballers
Dutch expatriate sportspeople in England
Dutch expatriate sportspeople in Hungary
Dutch expatriate sportspeople in Belgium
Dutch expatriate sportspeople in Romania
Expatriate footballers in England
Expatriate footballers in Hungary
Expatriate footballers in Belgium
Expatriate footballers in Romania